The following lists events that happened in 2016 in Croatia.

Incumbents 
 President – Kolinda Grabar-Kitarović 
 Prime Minister – Zoran Milanović (until 22 February), Tihomir Orešković (22 February – 19 October), Andrej Plenković (starting 19 October)

Events

January
Dragan Vasiljković, a former Serbian paramilitary commander, was charged with war crimes in Croatia on 8 January.

June
June 1 - A large protest in support of education reform is held in Zagreb and other Croatian cities.

August
August 5–21 - 41 athletes from Croatia will compete at the 2016 Summer Olympics in Rio de Janeiro, Brazil

Deaths
 January 23 – Josip Friščić, politician
 February 23 – Slobodan Lang, politician
 April 14 – Ilija Ivezić, actor
 June 18 – Sibe Mardešić, mathematician
 July 18 – Mladen Stilinović, artist
 July 25 – Slobodan Novak, writer
 August 7 – Anđelko Klobučar, composer
 September 10 – Jure Radić, engineer and politician
 October 1 – Jagoda Kaloper, actress
 October 3 – Ljupka Dimitrovska, singer

See also
2016 in Croatian television

References

 
2010s in Croatia
Years of the 21st century in Croatia
Croatia
Croatia